Sossi can refer to:

 SOSSI (in upper-case) - the Scouts on Stamps Society International 
 Richard A. Sossi, Maryland politician
In addition, the term in a lower-case form also has ties to Italian socialism